Simona Tabasco (born 5 April 1994) is an Italian actress.

Early life
Simona Tabasco was born in Naples on 5 April 1994. Tabasco is the daughter of an advertising graphic designer and an office worker. She has a twin brother named Marco.

Career
In 2013, after shooting two short films at the Giffoni Film Festival, Tabasco was cast in the second season of the Italian teen drama series Fuoriclasse. Broadcast on Rai 1 in March 2014, Tabasco portrayed Aida Merlissi, a Muslim girl. Filming for Fuoriclasse interrupted her studies at the Centro Sperimentale di Cinematografia in Rome, ultimately leading to her expulsion due to repeated absences.

In 2014, she made her film debut in Edoardo De Angelis's Perez., which received critical acclaim. For her role as Tea, daughter of the protagonist Demetrio (portrayed by Luca Zingaretti), Tabasco was awarded the Premio Guglielmo Biraghi at the 2015 Nastro d'Argento awards.

Since 2020, Tabasco has starred in the Italian medical drama Doc - Nelle tue mani, playing Elisa Russo, a resident in internal medicine.

In 2022, Tabasco made her international debut in the second season of the HBO anthology series The White Lotus. Her performance as Lucia, a sex worker in Sicily, received praise. CNN's Brian Lowry wrote that it "feels like a breakout role". Nylon magazine deemed her the "lifeblood" of the show, writing, "Lucia's energy is so infectious, thanks to the frenzied, effortless performance from Tabasco". Tabasco won the Screen Actors Guild Award for Outstanding Performance by an Ensemble in a Drama Series along with the cast of The White Lotus.

In February 2023, Tabasco was cast opposite Sydney Sweeney in the psychological horror film Immaculate.

In March 2023, Tabasco was included in Forbes magazine's annual 30 Under 30 list, which recognises the 30 most influential people in Europe under the age of 30.

Filmography

Film

Television

Music videos

Awards and nominations

References

External links
 

1994 births
Living people
21st-century Italian actresses
Actresses from Naples
Centro Sperimentale di Cinematografia alumni
Italian film actresses
Italian television actresses
Italian twins
Nastro d'Argento winners